Conocephalinae, meaning "conical head", is an Orthopteran subfamily in the family Tettigoniidae.

Genera 
The Orthoptera Species File lists the following subtribes and genera:

Tribe Agraeciini

Mostly South America, Africa, South-East Asia and Australia; Auth: Redtenbacher, 1891
 subtribe Agraeciina Redtenbacher, 1891
 Agraecia Serville, 1831
 subtribe Eumegalodontina Brongniart, 1892
 Lesina Walker, 1869
 subtribe Liarina Ingrisch, 1998
 Labugama Henry, 1932
 Liara Redtenbacher, 1891
 Macroxiphus Pictet, 1888
 subtribe Oxylakina Ingrisch, 1998
 Oxylakis Redtenbacher, 1891
 subtribe Salomonina Brongniart, 1897
 Salomona Blanchard, 1853
 subtribe undetermined (many genera)
 Coptaspis Redtenbacher, 1891

Tribe Armadillagraeciini
Australia; Auth: Rentz, Su & Ueshima, 2012
 Armadillagraecia Rentz, Su, Ueshima & Robinson, 2010
 Kapalgagraecia Rentz, Su, Ueshima & Robinson, 2010
 Lichenagraecia Rentz, Su & Ueshima, 2012

Tribe Cestrophorini
South America; Auth: Gorochov, 2015
 Acanthacara Scudder, 1869
 Cestrophorus Redtenbacher, 1891

Tribe Coniungopterini
Mostly South America and Australia; Auth: Rentz & Gurney, 1985
 Coniungoptera Rentz & Gurney, 1985
 Metholce Walker, 1871
 Veria Walker, 1869

Tribe Conocephalini
Auth: Burmeister, 1838

subtribe Karniellina Hemp & Heller, 2010 (Africa)
 Acanthoscirtes Hemp, 2012
 Chortoscirtes Hemp, 2010
 Fulvoscirtes Hemp, 2012
 Karniella Rehn, 1914
 Melanoscirtes Hemp, 2010
 Naskreckiella Ünal, 2005
 Phlesirtes Bolívar, 1922
subtribe not placed (global distribution)
 Conanalus Tinkham, 1943
 Conocephalus Thunberg, 1815
 subgenus Amurocephalus Storozhenko, 2004: A. chinensis (Redtenbacher, 1891) 
 subgenus Anisoptera Latreille, 1829
 subgenus Aphauropus: A. leptopterus Rehn & Hebard, 1915
 subgenus Chloroxiphidion Hebard, 1922
 subgenus Conocephalus Thunberg, 1815
 subgenus Dicellurina Rehn & Hebard, 1938
 subgenus Megalotheca Karny, 1907
 subgenus Opeastylus Rehn & Hebard, 1915
 subgenus Perissacanthus Rehn & Hebard, 1915
 Elasmometopus Chopard, 1952
 Enoplocephalacris Chopard, 1952
 Euxiphidion Bruner, 1915
 Fatuhivella Hebard, 1935
 Lipotactomimus Naskrecki, 2000
 Luzoniella Karny, 1926
 Nukuhivella Hebard, 1935
 Odontoxiphidium Morse, 1901
 Orchelimum Serville, 1838
 Paulianacris Chopard, 1952
 Thyridorhoptrum Rehn & Hebard, 1915
 Tympanotriba Piza, 1971 - monotypic: T. vittata Piza, 1971
 Xiphelimum Caudell, 1906 - monotypic: X. amplipennis Caudell, 1906

Tribe Copiphorini
Worldwide; Auth: Karny 1912; selected genera:

 Banza Walker, 1870
 Belocephalus Scudder, 1875
 Copiphora Serville, 1831
 Euconocephalus Karny, 1907
 Lanista Bolívar, 1890
 Moncheca Walker, 1869
 Neoconocephalus Karny, 1907
 Panacanthus Walker, 1869
 Pseudorhynchus Serville, 1838
 Pyrgocorypha Stål, 1873
 Ruspolia Schulthess Schindler, 1898
 Xestophrys Redtenbacher, 1891

Tribe Euconchophorini
Madagascar; Auth: Gorochov, 1988
 Amblylakis Redtenbacher, 1891
 Colossopus Saussure, 1899
 Euconchophora Brongniart, 1897
 Malagasopus Ünal & Beccaloni, 2017
 Odontolakis Redtenbacher, 1891
 Oncodopus Brongniart, 1897

Tribe undetermined
 Ebneria Karny, 1920 - China
 Elasmometopus Chopard, 1952 - Madagascar
 Graminofolium Nickle, 2007 - Neotropical
 Nemoricultrix Mello-Leitão, 1940 - Neotropical
 Paulianacris'' Chopard, 1952 - Madagascar

References 

 Gorochov, A.V., 2011: Taxonomy of the katydids (Orthoptera: Tettigoniidae) from east Asia and adjacent islands. Communication 2. Far Eastern Entomologist 227: 1-12.
 Ingrisch, S. 2015. A revision of the Axylus group of Agraeciini (Orthoptera: Tettigoniidae: Conocephalinae) and of some other species formerly included in Nicsara or Anthracites Revision of the Indo-Australian Conocephalinae, part 3. Zootaxa 4046 (1): 1–308.

External links 
 
 

 
Orthoptera subfamilies